Peter Bryden Malinauskas (born 14 August 1980) is an Australian politician serving as the 47th and current premier of South Australia since March 2022. He has been the leader of the South Australian branch of the Australian Labor Party (ALP) and a member of the House of Assembly (MHA) for the division of Croydon since April 2018. He was previously the Leader of the Opposition from 2018 until he led his party into government in the 2022 state election.

Malinauskas has been a Labor member of the South Australian House of Assembly since 2018, representing the electorate of Croydon. He was previously a member of the South Australian Legislative Council between 2015 and 2018.

Early life
Malinauskas was born in South Australia to Kathryn (Kate) née May and Peter Malinauskas on 14 August 1980. Malinauskas' paternal Hungarian grandmother Eta survived World War II and escaped the post-war communist Hungarian state when she emigrated to Bathurst in New South Wales. She married Peter Malinauskas Sr., a Lithuanian refugee, and the couple moved to Adelaide, later opening a fish and chip shop. Malinauskas' mother's forebears were middle-class Irish.

In his school years, Malinauskas' family resided in Colonel Light Gardens. Being from a Catholic family, Malinauskas was sent to Mercedes College where he displayed leadership potential in football and cricket, as well as excelling in his studies. He was a member of the student representative council and was school captain in year 12. Mercedes College principal Peter Daw recalled Malinauskas as being "a future leader". Additionally, Daw recalled Malinauskas as being "one of those kids involved in lots of things" and a "popular lad" with a "magnetic personality that appealed to teachers and students alike".

Union figure
Malinauskas worked for Woolworths for seven years from age 15, first as a trolley boy and later a checkout operator and night filler. He formed an early and enduring political relationship with Don Farrell through Woolworths workers' unionism. During his time at Woolworths, Malinauskas obtained a Bachelor of Commerce at the University of Adelaide. He became an influential union official who served from 2008 to 2015 as Secretary of the South Australian/Northern Territory branch of the Shop, Distributive and Allied Employees' Association (SDA), the major player in the dominant Labor Right faction of the South Australian branch of the Australian Labor Party. In August 2011, some media outlets claimed Malinauskas was the sole "faceless man" who informed Mike Rann he had lost the support of his party and to step down as premier of South Australia in favour of Jay Weatherill. Malinauskas was elected in July 2015 to Labor's National Executive at the party's National Conference.

Political views
Asked about progressive political issues in 2011 such as same sex marriage, stem-cell research, euthanasia and abortion, Malinauskas said his personal views would be "considered socially conservative" and went on to state "I didn't get involved in the Australian labour movement because of any of these issues. I believe in the fair go but I get frustrated with left-wing ideology that focuses more on imposing equality than providing for equality of opportunity. This is why I'm passionate about Australian education − universal access to quality schooling gives everyone the chance to succeed".

Asked about nuclear power in South Australia, Malinauskas in 2014 said he was pro-nuclear despite Labor at the time remaining opposed to the establishment of a new nuclear waste repository or nuclear power plant in South Australia. Malinauskas stated "I believe climate change is a real challenge we need to face up to, and nuclear energy can be a safe source of baseload power, with zero carbon emissions" and "we should have a mature debate based on science and economics to determine if a nuclear industry is viable in South Australia". In March 2015 Labor initiated a Nuclear Fuel Cycle Royal Commission, and in 2016 launched a "Get to know nuclear" campaign to further explore the commission's findings. In October 2016 at the South Australian Labor party conference, Malinauskas spoke of the protesters who had gathered outside in opposition to the establishment of new nuclear waste storage facilities. He told delegates: "The difference between us and them, of course, is that we take very seriously our obligation to make sure that our ideology is underpinned by evidence."

Parliamentary career

Following the parliamentary resignation of Bernard Finnigan on 12 November 2015, Malinauskas filled the Legislative Council casual vacancy in a joint sitting of the Parliament of South Australia on 1 December.

Premier Jay Weatherill indicated that Malinauskas could enter the Cabinet of South Australia in an early 2016 ministerial reshuffle, with reports of media speculation and internal party talk suggesting Malinauskas could potentially become the next Labor premier of South Australia, entering the House of Assembly through preselection as the next Labor candidate in Labor's safest lower house seat of Croydon with claims that incumbent Michael Atkinson "has long been willing to vacate his seat to Malinauskas if he ever wanted it". Atkinson announced in February 2017 that he would be retiring from parliament as of the 2018 election. Malinauskas confirmed he would be nominating for preselection.

Malinauskas served in the Cabinet of South Australia in the Weatherill Ministry between January 2016 and March 2018, holding, at various times, ministerial portfolios with responsibility for police (2016−2017), correctional services (2016−2017), emergency services (2016−2017), road safety (2016−2017), health (2017−2018), and mental health and substance abuse (2017−2018).

Malinauskas won the seat of Croydon at the 2018 election.

Leader of the Opposition, 2018–2022
Following the resignation of Jay Weatherill after the 2018 election, a caucus meeting on 9 April 2018 elected Malinauskas as Labor Leader. He consequently became Leader of the Opposition, with former Education Minister Susan Close as his deputy.

In April 2021, former Labor MP Annabel Digance and her husband were arrested and charged with attempting to blackmail Malinauskas. Police allege that the couple had threatened to make accusations against Malinauskas if he did not orchestrate Digance's return to politics by preselection for a safe seat or appointment to the Legislative Council or the Senate.

In January 2022, Malinauskas was diagnosed with COVID-19 and announced that he would isolate at home. He said his wife and three children had returned negative results. Grant Stevens, the South Australia Police Commissioner and State Coordinator during the COVID-19 pandemic in South Australia was also diagnosed on the same day. A few days later, Malinauskas reported that his wife and three children had also caught the virus. He had recovered and was back in the community on 13 January 2022.

Premier of South Australia 2022–present

In March 2022, Malinauskas led the party to victory at the state election. He was sworn in as premier of South Australia on 21 March 2022.

In May 2022, the Malinauskas government ended South Australia's state of emergency for COVID-19, after 793 consecutive days.

Soon after the election, Malinauskas pledged to implement a state-based Indigenous Voice to Parliament, as well as restarting treaty talks and greater investment in areas affecting Aboriginal South Australians. In July 2022 Dale Agius was appointed as the state's first Commissioner for First Nations Voice, with the role commencing in August. Kokatha elder Dr Roger Thomas would continue as Commissioner for Aboriginal Engagement for a further six months.

Ban from Russia
Following the 2022 Russian invasion of Ukraine, Malinauskas was listed among 121 Australians banned from entering Russia, possibly due to his Lithuanian background. He later joked that he was "grateful" to be included on the list.

Personal life 
Malinauskas is married to Annabel West, a partner at a legal firm in Adelaide. The couple has two daughters and a son.

See also
2022 South Australian state election
Shadow ministry of Peter Malinauskas
Malinauskas ministry

References

Notes

External links
  Retrieved 7 May 2020.
 

|-

|-

|-

|-

|-

1980 births
Living people
21st-century Australian politicians
Australian Labor Party members of the Parliament of South Australia
Labor Right politicians
Australian people of Hungarian descent
Australian people of Irish descent
Australian people of Lithuanian descent
Australian trade unionists
Members of the South Australian Legislative Council
Members of the South Australian House of Assembly
University of Adelaide alumni
Premiers of South Australia